The 1956 New Brunswick general election was held on June 18, 1956, to elect 52 members to the 43rd New Brunswick Legislative Assembly, the governing house of the province of New Brunswick, Canada. The incumbent Progressive Conservative government of Hugh John Flemming was re-elected.

References

1956 elections in Canada
Elections in New Brunswick
1956 in New Brunswick
June 1956 events in Canada